Arnold Bernhard Schwartz (11 March 1901 – 24 December 1975) was a Danish rower. He competed at the 1928 Summer Olympics in Amsterdam with the men's single sculls where he was eliminated in round two.

References

1901 births
1975 deaths
Danish male rowers
Olympic rowers of Denmark
Rowers at the 1928 Summer Olympics
People from Guldborgsund Municipality
European Rowing Championships medalists
Sportspeople from Region Zealand